The 2000 Pittsburgh Pirates season was the 119th season of the franchise; the 114th in the National League. This was their 31st and final season at Three Rivers Stadium. The Pirates finished fifth in the National League Central with a record of 69–93.

Offseason
December 10, 1999: Dale Sveum was signed as a free agent with the Pittsburgh Pirates.
December 13, 1999: Bruce Aven was traded by the Florida Marlins to the Pittsburgh Pirates for Brant Brown.
January 19, 2000: Luis Sojo was signed as a free agent with the Pittsburgh Pirates.
February 9, 2000: Josías Manzanillo was signed as a free agent with the Pittsburgh Pirates.
February 23, 2000: Al Martin was traded by the Pittsburgh Pirates with cash to the San Diego Padres for John Vander Wal, Geraldo Padua (minors), and James Sak (minors).

Regular season

Season standings

Game log

|- style="background:#fbb;"
| 1 || April 4 || Astros || 2–5 || Reynolds || Schmidt (0–1) || Wagner || 54,399 || 0–1
|- style="background:#fbb;"
| 2 || April 5 || Astros || 2–11 || Lima || Benson (0–1) || — || 12,208 || 0–2
|- style="background:#cfc;"
| 3 || April 6 || Astros || 10–1 || Cordova (1–0) || Holt || — || 11,860 || 1–2
|- style="background:#cfc;"
| 4 || April 7 || @ Diamondbacks || 7–2 || Christiansen (1–0) || Reynoso || — || 32,536 || 2–2
|- style="background:#fbb;"
| 5 || April 8 || @ Diamondbacks || 5–6 || Swindell || Christiansen (1–1) || — || 33,298 || 2–3
|- style="background:#fbb;"
| 6 || April 9 || @ Diamondbacks || 0–1 || Johnson || Schmidt (0–2) || — || 34,204 || 2–4
|- style="background:#fbb;"
| 7 || April 11 || Expos || 3–7 || Vazquez || Benson (0–2) || Kline || 11,335 || 2–5
|- style="background:#cfc;"
| 8 || April 12 || Expos || 6–4 || Silva (1–0) || Batista || Williams (1) || 10,290 || 3–5
|- style="background:#cfc;"
| 9 || April 13 || Expos || 4–3 || Silva (2–0) || Urbina || — || 11,162 || 4–5
|- style="background:#fbb;"
| 10 || April 14 || Mets || 5–8 (12) || Franco || Silva (2–1) || — || 20,725 || 4–6
|- style="background:#cfc;"
| 11 || April 15 || Mets || 2–0 || Anderson (1–0) || Rusch || Williams (2) || 19,592 || 5–6
|- style="background:#fbb;"
| 12 || April 16 || Mets || 9–12 || Mahomes || Peters (0–1) || Benitez || 20,724 || 5–7
|- style="background:#fbb;"
| 13 || April 18 || @ Marlins || 5–12 || Penny || Cordova (1–1) || — || 9,494 || 5–8
|- style="background:#cfc;"
| 14 || April 19 || @ Marlins || 5–1 || Ritchie (1–0) || Fernandez || — || 10,911 || 6–8
|- style="background:#fbb;"
| 15 || April 20 || @ Marlins || 2–3 (14) || Darensbourg || Williams (0–1) || — || 9,396 || 6–9
|- style="background:#fbb;"
| 16 || April 21 || @ Braves || 2–6 || Mulholland || Garcia (0–1) || — || 33,790 || 6–10
|- style="background:#fbb;"
| 17 || April 22 || @ Braves || 2–4 || Chen || Benson (0–3) || Rocker || 41,389 || 6–11
|- style="background:#fbb;"
| 18 || April 23 || @ Braves || 3–5 || Maddux || Cordova (1–2) || Rocker || 29,463 || 6–12
|- style="background:#cfc;"
| 19 || April 25 || Padres || 4–3 (11) || Sauerbeck (1–0) || Almanzar || — || 12,295 || 7–12
|- style="background:#cfc;"
| 20 || April 26 || Padres || 9–8 || Williams (1–1) || Whisenant || — || 13,765 || 8–12
|- style="background:#fbb;"
| 21 || April 27 || Padres || 4–12 || Clement || Parra (0–1) || — || 15,459 || 8–13
|- style="background:#cfc;"
| 22 || April 28 || Reds || 2–1 || Benson (1–3) || Harnisch || Williams (3) || 25,557 || 9–13
|- style="background:#fbb;"
| 23 || April 29 || Reds || 5–6 || Williamson || Christiansen (1–2) || Graves || 28,731 || 9–14
|- style="background:#fbb;"
| 24 || April 30 || Reds || 2–6 || Bell || Ritchie (1–1) || Williamson || 29,728 || 9–15
|-

|- style="background:#cfc;"
| 25 || May 2 || @ Cardinals || 10–7 || Wallace (1–0) || Slocumb || — || 38,588 || 10–15
|- style="background:#cfc;"
| 26 || May 3 || @ Cardinals || 8–2 || Benson (2–3) || Hentgen || — || 32,270 || 11–15
|- style="background:#fbb;"
| 27 || May 4 || @ Cardinals || 0–5 || Stephenson || Cordova (1–3) || — || 45,994 || 11–16
|- style="background:#cfc;"
| 28 || May 5 || @ Cubs || 4–2 || Ritchie (2–1) || Tapani || Williams (4) || 26,689 || 12–16
|- style="background:#cfc;"
| 29 || May 6 || @ Cubs || 11–9 || Wallace (2–0) || Farnsworth || Williams (5) || 38,957 || 13–16
|- style="background:#cfc;"
| 30 || May 7 || @ Cubs || 11–3 || Schmidt (1–2) || Wood || — || 38,307 || 14–16
|- style="background:#fbb;"
| 31 || May 9 || Mets || 0–2 || Hampton || Benson (2–4) || Benitez || 14,015 || 14–17
|- style="background:#cfc;"
| 32 || May 10 || Mets || 13–9 || Silva (3–1) || Cook || — || 13,711 || 15–17
|- style="background:#fbb;"
| 33 || May 11 || Mets || 2–3 || Leiter || Anderson (1–1) || — || 16,264 || 15–18
|- style="background:#fbb;"
| 34 || May 12 || Brewers || 1–6 || Haynes || Schmidt (1–3) || — || 18,524 || 15–19
|- style="background:#cfc;"
| 35 || May 13 || Brewers || 11–8 || Sauerbeck (2–0) || Acevedo || Williams (6) || 26,682 || 16–19
|- style="background:#cfc;"
| 36 || May 14 || Brewers || 3–0 || Benson (3–4) || D'Amico || Christiansen (1) || 19,657 || 17–19
|- style="background:#fbb;"
| 37 || May 16 || @ Reds || 2–6 || Bell || Ritchie (2–2) || — || 26,271 || 17–20
|- style="background:#cfc;"
| 38 || May 17 || @ Reds || 9–6 || Silva (4–1) || Sullivan || — || 23,193 || 18–20
|- style="background:#fbb;"
| 39 || May 18 || @ Reds || 3–4 (10) || Graves || Garcia (0–2) || — || 26,252 || 18–21
|- style="background:#cfc;"
| 40 || May 19 || Cardinals || 13–1 || Benson (4–4) || Ankiel || — || 24,281 || 19–21
|- style="background:#fbb;"
| 41 || May 20 || Cardinals || 4–19 || Hentgen || Cordova (1–4) || — || 36,331 || 19–22
|- style="background:#fbb;"
| 42 || May 21 || Cardinals || 5–7 || Benes || Ritchie (2–3) || Veres || 33,034 || 19–23
|- style="background:#fbb;"
| 43 || May 23 || @ Diamondbacks || 1–6 || Anderson || Anderson (1–2) || — || 31,726 || 19–24
|- style="background:#fbb;"
| 44 || May 24 || @ Diamondbacks || 5–6 || Stottlemyre || Schmidt (1–4) || Kim || 30,462 || 19–25
|- style="background:#fbb;"
| 45 || May 25 || @ Diamondbacks || 5–7 || Daal || Benson (4–5) || Mantei || 30,759 || 19–26
|- style="background:#cfc;"
| 46 || May 26 || @ Rockies || 2–1 || Cordova (2–4) || Yoshii || Williams (7) || 40,188 || 20–26
|- style="background:#fbb;"
| 47 || May 27 || @ Rockies || 6–7 || White || Christiansen (1–3) || — || 42,184 || 20–27
|- style="background:#fbb;"
| 48 || May 28 || @ Rockies || 2–11 || Arrojo || Anderson (1–3) || — || 41,641 || 20–28
|- style="background:#cfc;"
| 49 || May 29 || Marlins || 10–4 || Schmidt (2–4) || Nunez || — || 17,282 || 21–28
|- style="background:#cfc;"
| 50 || May 30 || Marlins || 3–2 (10) || Williams (2–1) || Alfonseca || — || 14,742 || 22–28
|- style="background:#cfc;"
| 51 || May 31 || Marlins || 5–2 || Cordova (3–4) || Sanchez || Williams (8) || 17,731 || 23–28
|-

|- style="background:#cfc;"
| 52 || June 2 || Royals || 9–3 || Ritchie (3–3) || Batista || — || 23,527 || 24–28
|- style="background:#fbb;"
| 53 || June 3 || Royals || 3–16 || Witasick || Schmidt (2–5) || — || 26,264 || 24–29
|- style="background:#fbb;"
| 54 || June 4 || Royals || 5–7 (11) || Rakers || Christiansen (1–4) || Reichert || 27,915 || 24–30
|- style="background:#cfc;"
| 55 || June 5 || Tigers || 5–1 || Cordova (4–4) || Mlicki || — || 12,479 || 25–30
|- style="background:#fbb;"
| 56 || June 6 || Tigers || 1–2 || Nitkowski || Anderson (1–4) || Jones || 13,174 || 25–31
|- style="background:#cfc;"
| 57 || June 7 || Tigers || 4–3 || Ritchie (4–3) || Nomo || Williams (9) || 15,067 || 26–31
|- style="background:#fbb;"
| 58 || June 9 || @ Royals || 5–6 (10) || Spradlin || Christiansen (1–5) || — || 30,963 || 26–32
|- style="background:#fbb;"
| 59 || June 10 || @ Royals || 1–2 (12) || Bottalico || Silva (4–2) || — || 34,868 || 26–33
|- style="background:#cfc;"
| 60 || June 11 || @ Royals || 10–6 (10) || Sauerbeck (3–0) || Spradlin || — || 26,495 || 27–33
|- style="background:#fbb;"
| 61 || June 12 || Braves || 8–10 || Ligtenberg || Christiansen (1–6) || Remlinger || 15,196 || 27–34
|- style="background:#cfc;"
| 62 || June 13 || Braves || 7–6 (10) || Silva (5–2) || Wengert || — || 17,971 || 28–34
|- style="background:#fbb;"
| 63 || June 14 || Braves || 4–8 || Maddux || Anderson (1–5) || Ligtenberg || 16,972 || 28–35
|- style="background:#cfc;"
| 64 || June 15 || Braves || 2–0 || Benson (5–5) || Millwood || — || 19,065 || 29–35
|- style="background:#fbb;"
| 65 || June 16 || Marlins || 3–8 || Cornelius || Cordova (4–5) || Looper || 29,737 || 29–36
|- style="background:#fbb;"
| 66 || June 17 || Marlins || 3–4 (11) || Alfonseca || Loiselle (0–1) || Strong || 23,552 || 29–37
|- style="background:#fbb;"
| 67 || June 18 || Marlins || 4–5 || Bones || Christiansen (1–7) || Alfonseca || 24,916 || 29–38
|- style="background:#fbb;"
| 68 || June 19 || @ Expos || 1–2 || Pavano || Loiselle (0–2) || Kline || 7,483 || 29–39
|- style="background:#cfc;"
| 69 || June 20 || @ Expos || 2–1 || Benson (6–5) || Johnson || Williams (10) || 8,056 || 30–39
|- style="background:#cfc;"
| 70 || June 21 || @ Expos || 8–3 || Cordova (5–5) || Armas || Peters (1) || 8,324 || 31–39
|- style="background:#fbb;"
| 71 || June 22 || @ Expos || 5–6 || Hermanson || Ritchie (4–4) || Telford || 8,635 || 31–40
|- style="background:#fbb;"
| 72 || June 23 || @ Mets || 2–12 || Jones || Arroyo (0–1) || — || 39,849 || 31–41
|- style="background:#fbb;"
| 73 || June 24 || @ Mets || 8–10 || Franco || Loiselle (0–3) || Benitez || 34,894 || 31–42
|- style="background:#fbb;"
| 74 || June 25 || @ Mets || 0–9 || Hampton || Benson (6–6) || — || 38,984 || 31–43
|- style="background:#cfc;"
| 75 || June 27 || Cubs || 6–0 || Ritchie (5–4) || Wood || — || 18,688 || 32–43
|- style="background:#fbb;"
| 76 || June 28 || Cubs || 4–5 || Lieber || Cordova (5–6) || Aguilera || 29,665 || 32–44
|- style="background:#cfc;"
| 77 || June 29 || Cubs || 5–4 (10) || Wilkins (1–0) || Worrell || — || 19,531 || 33–44
|- style="background:#cfc;"
| 78 || June 30 || @ Phillies || 8–3 || Benson (7–6) || Wolf || — || 38,221 || 34–44
|-

|- style="background:#fbb;"
| 79 || July 1 || @ Phillies || 3–4 || Byrd || Arroyo (0–2) || Brantley || 48,406 || 34–45
|- style="background:#fbb;"
| 80 || July 2 || @ Phillies || 1–9 || Schilling || Ritchie (5–5) || — || 20,290 || 34–46
|- style="background:#fbb;"
| 81 || July 3 || @ Cubs || 0–3 || Lieber || Cordova (5–7) || — || 40,524 || 34–47
|- style="background:#cfc;"
| 82 || July 4 || @ Cubs || 10–4 || Wilkins (2–0) || Aguilera || — || 37,043 || 35–47
|- style="background:#cfc;"
| 83 || July 5 || @ Cubs || 9–6 || Anderson (2–5) || Downs || — || 35,391 || 36–47
|- style="background:#cfc;"
| 84 || July 7 || Twins || 8–6 || Christiansen (2–7) || Wells || Williams (11) || 22,134 || 37–47
|- style="background:#cfc;"
| 85 || July 8 || Twins || 4–1 || Benson (8–6) || Milton || Williams (12) || 33,814 || 38–47
|- style="background:#fbb;"
| 86 || July 9 || Twins || 2–3 || Redman || Silva (5–3) || Hawkins || 23,154 || 38–48
|- style="background:#fbb;"
| 87 || July 13 || @ Indians || 3–4 (10) || Karsay || Sauerbeck (3–1) || — || 43,225 || 38–49
|- style="background:#fbb;"
| 88 || July 14 || @ Indians || 3–9 || Finley || Benson (8–7) || — || 43,046 || 38–50
|- style="background:#fbb;"
| 89 || July 15 || @ Indians || 4–6 || Brewington || Silva (5–4) || Karsay || 43,049 || 38–51
|- style="background:#fbb;"
| 90 || July 16 || @ Dodgers || 3–7 || Adams || Williams (2–2) || — || 34,116 || 38–52
|- style="background:#fbb;"
| 91 || July 17 || @ Dodgers || 6–9 || Dreifort || Arroyo (0–3) || Shaw || 25,261 || 38–53
|- style="background:#cfc;"
| 92 || July 18 || @ Dodgers || 8–6 || Manzanillo (1–0) || Judd || Williams (13) || 34,872 || 39–53
|- style="background:#fbb;"
| 93 || July 19 || @ Brewers || 0–6 || D'Amico || Benson (8–8) || — || 20,840 || 39–54
|- style="background:#cfc;"
| 94 || July 20 || @ Brewers || 9–2 || Silva (6–4) || Haynes || — || 29,389 || 40–54
|- style="background:#cfc;"
| 95 || July 21 || Phillies || 9–2 || Anderson (3–5) || Byrd || — || 22,438 || 41–54
|- style="background:#cfc;"
| 96 || July 22 || Phillies || 2–1 || Arroyo (1–3) || Person || Williams (14) || 28,485 || 42–54
|- style="background:#fbb;"
| 97 || July 23 || Phillies || 1–4 || Schilling || Ritchie (5–6) || — || 23,840 || 42–55
|- style="background:#fbb;"
| 98 || July 25 || Brewers || 1–4 (11) || Leskanic || Christiansen (2–8) || Wickman || 15,808 || 42–56
|- style="background:#cfc;"
| 99 || July 26 || Brewers || 5–4 || Silva (7–4) || Haynes || Williams (15) || 20,421 || 43–56
|- style="background:#fbb;"
| 100 || July 27 || Brewers || 3–4 || Leskanic || Manzanillo (1–1) || Wickman || 16,636 || 43–57
|- style="background:#cfc;"
| 101 || July 28 || Padres || 16–5 || Arroyo (2–3) || Clement || — || 20,686 || 44–57
|- style="background:#cfc;"
| 102 || July 29 || Padres || 10–2 || Cordova (6–7) || Tollberg || — || 30,118 || 45–57
|- style="background:#fbb;"
| 103 || July 30 || Padres || 8–9 || Wall || Wilkins (2–1) || Hoffman || 19,680 || 45–58
|-

|- style="background:#cfc;"
| 104 || August 1 || Dodgers || 6–0 || Anderson (4–5) || Perez || — || — || 46–58
|- style="background:#fbb;"
| 105 || August 1 || Dodgers || 3–5 || Herges || Wilkins (2–2) || Shaw || 21,028 || 46–59
|- style="background:#fbb;"
| 106 || August 2 || Dodgers || 5–11 || Dreifort || Silva (7–5) || — || 19,537 || 46–60
|- style="background:#fbb;"
| 107 || August 3 || @ Giants || 2–10 || Ortiz || Cordova (6–8) || — || 40,930 || 46–61
|- style="background:#fbb;"
| 108 || August 4 || @ Giants || 3–5 || Henry || Benson (8–9) || Nen || 40,930 || 46–62
|- style="background:#cfc;"
| 109 || August 5 || @ Giants || 7–2 || Serafini (1–0) || Gardner || — || 40,930 || 47–62
|- style="background:#fbb;"
| 110 || August 6 || @ Giants || 1–7 || Estes || Arroyo (2–4) || — || 40,930 || 47–63
|- style="background:#cfc;"
| 111 || August 7 || @ Rockies || 8–7 || Sauerbeck (4–1) || Jimenez || Williams (16) || 39,691 || 48–63
|- style="background:#fbb;"
| 112 || August 8 || @ Rockies || 1–6 || Rose || Silva (7–6) || — || 38,535 || 48–64
|- style="background:#fbb;"
| 113 || August 9 || @ Rockies || 3–4 || White || Williams (2–3) || — || 39,328 || 48–65
|- style="background:#fbb;"
| 114 || August 11 || Diamondbacks || 1–6 || Reynoso || Serafini (1–1) || — || 25,281 || 48–66
|- style="background:#cfc;"
| 115 || August 12 || Diamondbacks || 9–6 || Sauerbeck (5–1) || Schilling || — || 34,101 || 49–66
|- style="background:#fbb;"
| 116 || August 13 || Diamondbacks || 6–7 || Morgan || Arroyo (2–5) || Mantei || 25,321 || 49–67
|- style="background:#fbb;"
| 117 || August 14 || @ Astros || 2–16 || Holt || Silva (7–7) || — || 30,220 || 49–68
|- style="background:#fbb;"
| 118 || August 15 || @ Astros || 4–5 || Lima || Benson (8–10) || Dotel || 30,020 || 49–69
|- style="background:#fbb;"
| 119 || August 16 || @ Astros || 10–11 || Elarton || Serafini (1–2) || Dotel || 30,165 || 49–70
|- style="background:#cfc;"
| 120 || August 18 || @ Reds || 6–3 || Ritchie (6–6) || Sullivan || Williams (17) || 31,891 || 50–70
|- style="background:#fbb;"
| 121 || August 19 || @ Reds || 1–7 || Parris || Anderson (4–6) || — || 34,370 || 50–71
|- style="background:#cfc;"
| 122 || August 20 || @ Reds || 7–3 || Silva (8–7) || Dessens || — || 32,545 || 51–71
|- style="background:#fbb;"
| 123 || August 21 || @ Cardinals || 4–7 || Stephenson || Benson (8–11) || Veres || 35,644 || 51–72
|- style="background:#cfc;"
| 124 || August 22 || @ Cardinals || 6–2 || Manzanillo (2–1) || Kile || — || 31,534 || 52–72
|- style="background:#fbb;"
| 125 || August 23 || @ Cardinals || 2–5 || Ankiel || Ritchie (6–7) || Veres || 31,288 || 52–73
|- style="background:#fbb;"
| 126 || August 25 || Rockies || 3–6 || Tavarez || Anderson (4–7) || — || 23,104 || 52–74
|- style="background:#fbb;"
| 127 || August 26 || Rockies || 4–11 || Astacio || Silva (8–8) || — || 23,340 || 52–75
|- style="background:#fbb;"
| 128 || August 27 || Rockies || 2–9 || Bohanon || Serafini (1–3) || — || 20,157 || 52–76
|- style="background:#fbb;"
| 129 || August 28 || Giants || 4–5 || Embree || Sauerbeck (5–2) || Nen || 15,125 || 52–77
|- style="background:#cfc;"
| 130 || August 29 || Giants || 8–0 || Benson (9–11) || Hernandez || — || 14,306 || 53–77
|- style="background:#fbb;"
| 131 || August 30 || Giants || 0–2 || Ortiz || Anderson (4–8) || Nen || 16,576 || 53–78
|- style="background:#fbb;"
| 132 || August 31 || Giants || 2–10 || Rueter || Silva (8–9) || — || 13,781 || 53–79
|-

|- style="background:#cfc;"
| 133 || September 1 || @ Padres || 3–2 (10) || Williams (3–3) || Hoffman || — || 16,813 || 54–79
|- style="background:#cfc;"
| 134 || September 2 || @ Padres || 6–3 || Ritchie (7–7) || Clement || Sauerbeck (1) || 33,358 || 55–79
|- style="background:#cfc;"
| 135 || September 3 || @ Padres || 8–6 (13) || Skrmetta (1–0) || Almanzar || Williams (18) || 20,389 || 56–79
|- style="background:#cfc;"
| 136 || September 4 || @ Dodgers || 12–1 || Anderson (5–8) || Dreifort || — || 31,418 || 57–79
|- style="background:#cfc;"
| 137 || September 5 || @ Dodgers || 8–0 || Silva (9–9) || Perez || — || 22,780 || 58–79
|- style="background:#cfc;"
| 138 || September 6 || @ Dodgers || 8–3 || Serafini (2–3) || Valdez || — || 28,462 || 59–79
|- style="background:#cfc;"
| 139 || September 8 || Reds || 7–3 || Ritchie (8–7) || Williamson || — || — || 60–79
|- style="background:#cfc;"
| 140 || September 8 || Reds || 3–1 || Wilkins (3–2) || Villone || Williams (19) || 26,486 || 61–79
|- style="background:#fbb;"
| 141 || September 9 || Reds || 4–6 || Parris || Benson (9–12) || Graves || 34,590 || 61–80
|- style="background:#fbb;"
| 142 || September 10 || Reds || 4–6 || Dessens || Anderson (5–9) || Graves || 35,046 || 61–81
|- style="background:#fbb;"
| 143 || September 11 || Cardinals || 4–8 || Stephenson || Manzanillo (2–2) || — || 16,583 || 61–82
|- style="background:#fbb;"
| 144 || September 12 || Cardinals || 1–11 || Kile || Serafini (2–4) || — || 15,824 || 61–83
|- style="background:#fbb;"
| 145 || September 13 || Cardinals || 5–9 || Ankiel || Ritchie (8–8) || — || 22,236 || 61–84
|- style="background:#fbb;"
| 146 || September 14 || @ Astros || 7–8 || Slusarski || Skrmetta (1–1) || — || 36,740 || 61–85
|- style="background:#fbb;"
| 147 || September 15 || @ Astros || 7–16 || Powell || Skrmetta (1–2) || Slusarski || 32,661 || 61–86
|- style="background:#fbb;"
| 148 || September 16 || @ Astros || 9–10 (10) || Valdes || Sauerbeck (5–3) || — || 41,248 || 61–87
|- style="background:#fbb;"
| 149 || September 17 || @ Astros || 3–5 || Elarton || Serafini (2–5) || Dotel || 40,036 || 61–88
|- style="background:#cfc;"
| 150 || September 18 || @ Phillies || 6–5 || Loiselle (1–3) || Padilla || Williams (20) || 11,470 || 62–88
|- style="background:#cfc;"
| 151 || September 19 || @ Phillies || 12–8 || Skrmetta (2–2) || Telemaco || Williams (21) || 11,362 || 63–88
|- style="background:#cfc;"
| 152 || September 20 || @ Phillies || 7–6 (10) || Loiselle (2–3) || Brock || Williams (22) || 12,762 || 64–88
|- style="background:#fbb;"
| 153 || September 21 || @ Brewers || 2–12 || Rigdon || Anderson (5–10) || — || 14,688 || 64–89
|- style="background:#cfc;"
| 154 || September 23 || @ Brewers || 4–2 || Silva (10–9) || D'Amico || Williams (23) || — || 65–89
|- style="background:#fbb;"
| 155 || September 23 || @ Brewers || 4–5 (10) || Leskanic || Arroyo (2–6) || — || 26,040 || 65–90
|- style="background:#fbb;"
| 156 || September 24 || @ Brewers || 5–8 || Leskanic || Williams (3–4) || — || 26,186 || 65–91
|- style="background:#cfc;"
| 157 || September 26 || Astros || 9–4 || Benson (10–12) || Holt || — || 14,311 || 66–91
|- style="background:#fbb;"
| 158 || September 27 || Astros || 1–10 || McKnight || Anderson (5–11) || — || 14,511 || 66–92
|- style="background:#cfc;"
| 159 || September 28 || Astros || 3–2 || Silva (11–9) || Dotel || — || 17,710 || 67–92
|- style="background:#cfc;"
| 160 || September 29 || Cubs || 8–4 || Wilkins (4–2) || Rain || — || 40,128 || 68–92
|- style="background:#cfc;"
| 161 || September 30 || Cubs || 4–2 || Ritchie (9–8) || Quevedo || Williams (24) || 43,458 || 69–92
|-

|- style="background:#fbb;"
| 162 || October 1 || Cubs || 9–10 || Farnsworth || Sauerbeck (5–4) || Arnold || 55,351 || 69–93
|-

|-
| Legend:       = Win       = LossBold = Pirates team member

Record vs. opponents

Detailed records

Roster

Opening Day lineup

Player stats
Batting
Note: G = Games played; AB = At bats; H = Hits; Avg. = Batting average; HR = Home runs; RBI = Runs batted in

Pitching
Note: G = Games pitched; IP = Innings pitched; W = Wins; L = Losses; ERA = Earned run average; SO = Strikeouts

Awards and honors

2000 Major League Baseball All-Star Game
Jason Kendall, C, reserve
Brian Giles, OF, reserve

Transactions
August 6, 2000: Bruce Aven was sent to the Los Angeles Dodgers by the Pittsburgh Pirates as part of a conditional deal.
August 7, 2000: Luis Sojo was traded by the Pittsburgh Pirates to the New York Yankees for Chris Spurling.

Farm system

References

 2000 Pittsburgh Pirates at Baseball Reference
 2000 Pittsburgh Pirates  at Baseball Almanac

Pittsburgh Pirates seasons
Pittsburgh Pirates Season, 2000
Pittsburgh Pirates Season, 2000
Pitts